Teri Hatcher (born December 8, 1964) is an American actress best known for her portrayals of Lois Lane on the television series Lois & Clark: The New Adventures of Superman (1993–1997); Paris Carver in the James Bond film Tomorrow Never Dies (1997); and Susan Mayer on the television series Desperate Housewives (2004–2012), for which she won the Golden Globe Award for Best Actress in a Musical or Comedy and three Screen Actors Guild Awards (one as lead female actor, two as part of Best Ensemble), and was nominated for a Primetime Emmy Award for Outstanding Lead Actress in a Comedy Series.

Early life
Hatcher was born on December 8, 1964, in Palo Alto, California, the only child of Esther (née Beshur), a computer programmer who worked for Lockheed Martin, and Owen Walker Hatcher, Jr., a nuclear physicist and electrical engineer. Her father is of English, Welsh, Irish and Choctaw descent, while her mother is of Syrian, Czech and Irish ancestry.

Hatcher took ballet lessons at the San Juan School of Dance in Los Altos and grew up in Sunnyvale, California. At De Anza College she studied mathematics and engineering.

In March 2006, she alleged that she was sexually abused from the age of five by Richard Hayes Stone, an uncle by marriage who was later divorced by Hatcher's aunt. She said her parents were unaware of the incest. In 2002, she assisted Santa Clara County prosecutors with their indictment of Stone for a more recent sexual offense that led his female victim to commit suicide at 14. Stone pleaded guilty to four counts of child sexual abuse and was sentenced to 14 years in prison. Hatcher said she told the prosecutors about her own abuse because she was haunted by thoughts of the 14-year-old girl who shot herself, and feared Stone might escape conviction. Stone died of colon cancer on August 19, 2008, after serving six years of his sentence.

Career

1984–1992: Early work
Hatcher studied acting at the American Conservatory Theater. One of her early jobs (in 1984) was as an NFL cheerleader with the San Francisco 49ers. From September 1985 to May 1986 she joined the cast of the TV series The Love Boat as Amy, one of the Mermaid showgirls. It mainly involved dancing and singing as part of the Mermaids show routine, but she had short comedic lines in some episodes, and in one episode was part of one of three storylines opposite a male guest star. From 1986 to 1989, she appeared in six episodes of the TV series MacGyver as talkative but naive Penny Parker opposite Richard Dean Anderson's eponymous hero.

In 1987, she played the sensible, intelligent 18-year-old daughter of Patty Duke's lead character in the short-lived Fox comedy Karen's Song, and had a guest-star role in an episode of Night Court. In 1988, she made a short guest appearance in the Star Trek: The Next Generation episode The Outrageous Okona as Lt. Robinson. In 1989, she guest-starred in an episode of Quantum Leap, "Star Crossed", as the main character's mathematician/scientist future wife; and guest-starred as a nude beauty pageant winner in an episode of L.A. Law. That year she also made her motion picture debut with a minor role as a young opportunistic actress in The Big Picture, starring Kevin Bacon. She then played Sylvester Stallone's younger sister, a dancer, in the big-budget police action-comedy Tango and Cash, also starring Kurt Russell; it was a critical and box office disappointment.

After a short guest appearance in an episode of Murphy Brown in 1990, Hatcher's next TV series role, in 1991, was in the Norman Lear creation Sunday Dinner, a comedy. She co-starred as 30-year-old lawyer in a mostly physical relationship with a widowed businessman twice her age, played by Robert Loggia. The series had a brief run on CBS that summer but was not renewed.  She also acted in the television crime movie Dead in the Water (1991) in which she plays Bryan Brown's lawyer's young, attractive temptress secretary, and in the low-budget erotic thriller The Cool Surface (not released until 1994), wherein she plays a young actress who has an ill-fated romance with an enigmatic, unsettled screenwriter. In late 1991 Hatcher was featured as Michael Bolton's love interest in the music video for Bolton's hit song "Missing You Now".  In 1992, Hatcher tried out for the role of Jamie Buchman on Mad About You and made it to the final two choices, but lost the part to Helen Hunt.

1993–1997: Breakthrough
Hatcher made a much-discussed guest appearance on a 1993 episode of Seinfeld, in which her character, Sidra, breaks up with Jerry because she believes Jerry sent his friend Elaine into a sauna to find out if Sidra's breasts are natural or enhanced by surgery. The episode concludes with Sidra saying to Jerry, "By the way, they're real, and they're spectacular" as she leaves his apartment. Hatcher returned to play Sidra in brief scenes in two subsequent episodes: "The Pilot", the fourth season finale, and "The Finale (Part 2)", the series finale. 

Hatcher landed a starring role in the ABC television series Lois & Clark: The New Adventures of Superman as the Daily Planet reporter Lois Lane (opposite Dean Cain as Superman/Clark Kent) from 1993 to 1997. At the height of the show's popularity in 1995, a picture of Hatcher wrapped in a Superman cape was reportedly the most downloaded image on the Internet for several months. "It's a great shot," she said. "Not so much because it's me. It's just cool looking." Hatcher also co-wrote an episode for season three called "It's A Small World After All" about a former classmate who shrinks and kidnaps her classmate's spouses and traps them in a dollhouse.

Hatcher hosted NBC's Saturday Night Live in 1996. Hatcher won the role of Paris Carver (beating Monica Bellucci) in the 1997 James Bond film Tomorrow Never Dies. Hatcher was three months pregnant at the filming's start, by her husband, Jon Tenney. A publicist said the pregnancy did not affect the production schedule. 
She was voted the world's sexiest woman by readers of popular men's magazine FHM in spring 1997 after having been number four in 1996 and was number 15 in 1998; she also made the list's top 100 in 1999 and 2000. Celebrity Sleuth ranked her as its Sexiest Woman for 1997, the only year it ranked her in its Top 25 list. The Australian version of FHM began a 100 Sexiest Women list in 1998 and Hatcher placed 25th on the list, but she did not make the next list published in 2000.

Hatcher also appeared in films such as Spy Kids (2001), and played a villain in two crime dramas, the ensemble 2 Days in the Valley (1996), a moderate box office success, and Heaven's Prisoners (1996), co-starring Alec Baldwin, which failed at the box office.

Hatcher appeared in a series of RadioShack television commercials alongside National Football League player Howie Long.

2004–2012: Commercial success with Desperate Housewives

She beat four other actresses for one of the lead roles on ABC's Desperate Housewives, in which she starred as Susan Mayer, a role for which she won the Best Actress in a Musical or Comedy Golden Globe Award in January 2005. Later that year, Hatcher won the Screen Actors Guild (SAG) award in the same category. In July 2005, she was nominated for an Emmy award as Outstanding Lead Actress in a Comedy Series, along with co-stars Marcia Cross and Felicity Huffman.

Hatcher again made FHM's world's sexiest woman list in 2005 and 2006, placing at 63 and 81 those years, respectively. The US version of FHM ranked her in its US's 100 Sexiest Woman list five times between its inaugural edition in 2000 and 2007, with peaks of number 7 in 2005 and number 10 in 2006. and she was on the cover of the magazine's February 2005 edition.  Hatcher also re-entered the FHM Australia's Top 100 Sexiest Women list in 2005 and 2006 ranking 19 and 50 those years. She made similar lists in the German and Portuguese versions of FHM those years. Maxim Magazine placed her in its Top 100 listing of Sexiest Women of 2006 (a listing they began in 1999) at number 73.

As of April 2006, Hatcher was one of the highest paid television actresses in the United States, reportedly earning $285,000 per episode of Desperate Housewives. That year she was one of the three nominees for Favorite Television Performer for the People's Choice Awards and was again nominated for a Golden Globe as Lead Actress in a television comedy program.  In May 2006, she released her first book, Burnt Toast: And Other Philosophies of Life.
Hatcher performed The Beatles song "Good Night" on the 2006 charity album Unexpected Dreams – Songs From the Stars.
On April 9, 2008, Hatcher appeared on Idol Gives Back, singing Carrie Underwood's "Before He Cheats". She voiced the Other Mother, a mysterious, button-eyed figure, as well as Coraline's mother Mel Jones, who constantly shows Coraline "tough love," both in the 2009 film Coraline, which received critical acclaim.

In 2010, Hatcher made a return to the Superman franchise, with a special guest role in the final season of Smallville as Ella Lane, the mother of Erica Durance's Lois Lane. The episode continued a tradition of former Lois Lane actresses portraying the character's mother many years later. Noel Neill appeared as Lois' mother in the 1978 film Superman: The Movie, and Phyllis Coates made a similar appearance on Lois & Clark.

A report in November 2010 suggested that Hatcher, along with co-star Felicity Huffman, would be quitting Desperate Housewives, but ABC denied the claim. Hatcher later addressed the rumors of her departure from Desperate Housewives, saying that "[t]here are not enough adjectives to describe how stupid, off base, and ridiculously untrue this is". However, after the show concluded in 2012, media sources revealed an apparent rift with her co-stars. It has been widely speculated that the cast did not get along well with Hatcher. Eva Longoria, Felicity Huffman, Marcia Cross, and Vanessa Williams gave thank-you gifts to the crew from the show which included a message with their names inscribed at the end, and Hatcher's name was distinctly absent. TV Guide source, William Keck, revealed that "something went down" between Hatcher and the cast that caused a rift, and also observed how Hatcher would physically distance herself from the others during breaks in filming. On her end, Hatcher said to TV Guide that "I will never disclose the true and complicated journey of us all, but I wish everyone on the show well."

In 2011, Men's Health magazine named Hatcher #38 on their "Hottest Women of All Time" list.

2013–present: Post-Desperate Housewives work
Hatcher voiced Dottie in the films Planes (2013) and Planes: Fire & Rescue (2014). In 2016, Hatcher had a recurring role as Charlotte, a successful single mother who becomes Oscar's (Matthew Perry) love interest in the second season of the comedy series  The Odd Couple. In 2017, Hatcher appeared as Queen Rhea of Daxam in a recurring role on The CW series Supergirl.

In 2018, Hatcher debuted a YouTube channel called Hatching Change. It includes two segments: "Van Therapy" and "Don't Eat 'It' Out Of a Box".  Since Desperate Housewives went off the air, Hatcher, who was already an active baker, has gotten very interested and involved in cooking including taking lessons at various times. Hatcher became a champion in season 17 of Chopped on the Food Network by winning the Holiday Celebrity episode. She also participated in The Great British Bake Off in the fifth episode of the Stand Up to Cancer series of 2018, which she also won.

Personal life

Hatcher married Marcus Leithold, of Butler, Pennsylvania, on June 4, 1988; they divorced the following year. On May 27, 1994, she married actor Jon Tenney; they had a daughter, Emerson, born in 1997. They divorced in March 2003. In 2007, Hatcher began writing a column for Glamour magazine. Hatcher endorsed Democratic primary candidate Andrew Yang in the 2020 presidential election.

Filmography

Film

Television

Awards and nominations

Honors 
 1996: Honored as the Female Discovery of the Year by the Golden Apple Awards. 
 2011: Nominated — Favorite Online Sensation by the People's Choice Awards.

Accolades

References

External links

 
 
 
 
 
 
 
 
 

1964 births
20th-century American actresses
21st-century American actresses
21st-century American writers
Actresses from Palo Alto, California
American cheerleaders
American film actresses
American people of Czech descent
American people of Choctaw descent
American people of English descent
American people of Irish descent
American people of Syrian descent
American people of Welsh descent
American television actresses
American voice actresses
American YouTubers
Best Musical or Comedy Actress Golden Globe (television) winners
De Anza College alumni
Living people
National Football League cheerleaders
Outstanding Performance by a Female Actor in a Comedy Series Screen Actors Guild Award winners
Writers from Palo Alto, California
Writers from Sunnyvale, California
American Conservatory Theater alumni